Bernard Reedy Jr. (born December 31, 1991) is an  American football wide receiver who is a free agent. He was signed by the Atlanta Falcons as an undrafted free agent in 2014. He played college football at Toledo.

College career
Reedy played college football at the University of Toledo. He finished his career with 195 receptions for 2,743 yards and 23 touchdowns. He was a major contributor in his team´s success.

Professional career

Atlanta Falcons
Reedy was signed to the Atlanta Falcons as an undrafted free agent. On September 2, 2015, he was released by the Falcons.

Tampa Bay Buccaneers
On February 5, 2016, he was signed to a futures contract by the Tampa Bay Buccaneers. On September 3, 2016, he was released by the Buccaneers as part of final roster cuts. He was signed to the practice squad on December 6, 2016. On December 21, 2016, he was promoted to the active roster. In Week 3, against the Minnesota Vikings, Reedy recorded his first career NFL carry, a three-yard rush. On November 17, 2017, Reedy was waived by the Buccaneers.

New England Patriots
On November 22, 2017, Reedy was signed to the New England Patriots' practice squad. He was promoted to the active roster on December 2, 2017. He was waived on December 13, 2017, and later re-signed to the practice squad. He was released on January 3, 2018. He was re-signed to the Patriots active roster on January 17, 2018. The Patriots made it to Super Bowl LII only to lose to the Philadelphia Eagles.

On March 7, 2018, Reedy was waived by the Patriots.

Tampa Bay Buccaneers (second stint)
On May 23, 2018, Reedy signed with the Tampa Bay Buccaneers. He was waived on September 1, 2018.

Arizona Cardinals
On October 2, 2018, Reedy was signed to the Arizona Cardinals' practice squad. On October 15, 2018, the Cardinals released Reedy.

Tampa Bay Buccaneers (third stint)
On November 6, 2018, Reedy was signed to the Tampa Bay Buccaneers practice squad.

New York Guardians
Reedy signed with the New York Guardians of the XFL on January 7, 2020. He was waived during final roster cuts on January 22, 2020.

Calgary Stampeders
Reedy signed with the Calgary Stampeders of the CFL on March 20, 2020. He was released on July 19, 2021.

References

External links
Toledo Rockets bio

1991 births
Living people
American football wide receivers
Arizona Cardinals players
Atlanta Falcons players
Calgary Stampeders players
New England Patriots players
New York Guardians players
Players of American football from St. Petersburg, Florida
Players of Canadian football from St. Petersburg, Florida
Tampa Bay Buccaneers players
Toledo Rockets football players